The 2016 Portland Timbers season was the sixth season for the Portland Timbers in Major League Soccer (MLS), the top-flight professional soccer league in the United States and Canada. The Timbers began this season as 2015 MLS Cup champions, but failed to qualify for the 2016 playoffs after a 4–1 away defeat to the Vancouver Whitecaps on the final league day, also resulting in them failing to win the Cascadia Cup.

Background

Season review

March

The reigning champions started their season against Columbus Crew SC.  It was the fourth consecutive home opener being the first match of the season for the Timbers.  As it has been since 2011, the Timbers Army led the national anthem and raised a tifo remembering the MLS Cup final victory with the words "Kiss. Dance.  Love.  You always remember your first."  The Timbers were able to start strong with Valeri making the first goal in the 23rd minute from a free kick just outside the 18-yard box.  Columbus would soon return the blow with a goal that came out of nothing.  In the 68th minute, Higuaín was able to control the ball that lightly bounced off of Taylor's back and finish with a bicycle kick to equalize Columbus Crew SC.  The Timbers answered in the 79th minute with a goal from Adi, who recovered the deflection from goalkeeper Steve Clark that blocked Asprilla's low shot.  The Timbers won, 2–1.

The Timber's felt the loss of Liam Ridgewell who was ruled out with a hamstring injury shortly before the San Jose away match.  Jermaine Taylor would be moved into the center back position due to Ridgewell's injury and give Zack Valentin his first start for the Timbers as he filled Taylor's position at left back.  The Timber's would fall 2–1 with a late goal from substitute Jack McInerney.

Jack Barmby was announced to join the Timbers on loan from Leicester City and Darren Mattocks was signed from Vancouver Whitecaps FC.

The Timbers faced off with Real Salt Lake at home for a 2–2 draw.  Despite playing against a 9-man Salt Lake squad, out-shooting them 26–7, and having 17 corners to their 4, the Timbers were unable to steal the victory and had to settle for the draw.  Darren Mattocks was subbed in during this match, making it his first match since joining the Timbers. Fanendo Adi was the lone scorer, putting the ball in the back of the net in the 79th minute and converted a penalty in the 84th minute.

Position at the end of March

April
The Timbers started April on the road in Orlando, Florida, as they faced the current top team in the Eastern Conference, Orlando City FC.  The team continued to tinker with the left back position, this time starting Jack Barmby instead of Valentin, giving Barmy his first start and appearance for the Timbers. The Timbers would suffer a harsh defeat of 4–1 with Fanendo Adi's penalty being blocked and allowing Orlando to convert their penalty.  Jack McInerney was able to perform a late goal again, preventing Orlando's shutout.

The Timbers continued their search for a win on the road, this time against LA Galaxy.  Chris Klute returned to the first team from Timbers 2, getting his first appearance as the squad continued to find a replacement for the left back position.  The Timbers also changed their formation for this match from a 4–3–3 to a 4–2–3–1 putting Jack Jewsbury with Chara in the defensive midfielder positions.  in the 52nd minute, Diego Valeri was able to send the ball to Fanendo Adi who managed a nice angle shot to send the ball inside the far end of the net.  In the 74th minute, the Darlington Nagbe had to be carried off the pitch and return to the locker room via wheelchair due to a serious foul by Nigel de Jong to the ankle, who managed to escape with only a yellow card.  Later on during the week, the MLS Disciplinary Committee would rule it was a red and de Jong was handed a 3-game suspension.  Nagbe would later be ruled with an ankle sprain, contusion.  Unfortunately, the Timbers would have to settle for the draw due to an own goal from Nat Borchers in the 83rd minute, continuing the Timbers search for a win on the road.

The Timbers continued their busy week, this time going against FC Dallas on a rainy Wednesday evening, 3 days after their draw with LA.  This would be the first time the Timbers would have to play against a former player, Maximiliano Urruti.  The Timbers would feel his presence as he made two key turnovers to give FC Dallas 2 goals, although he would not score any himself.  Darren Mattocks prevented FC Dallas' clean sheet by scoring in the 67th minute, giving him his first goal as a Timber player. The Timbers fell 3–1 to FC Dallas.

The Timbers played their 3rd and final match of the week, taking a victory at home against San Jose Earthquakes.  Jack McInerney got his first start and scored the first goal of the match in the 52nd minute.  Fanendo Adi followed with two more goals in the 65th and 90th+9 minute.  Diego Valeri would eventually get a 2nd yellow for kicking the ball away and accidentally hitting Anibal Goody in the face.

For their final match of April, the Timbers traveled to New England.  Still plagued with injuries and a red card suspension, the Timbers had to make some new roster changes for this match.  The Timbers switched to a 4–4–2, starting Jake Gleeson for an injured Kawarsey and Jewsbury would stand in for a suspended Valeri. Nagbe and Asprilla made their returns for this match.  At the 61st minute, the Timbers subbed in Jack Barmby as a forward and scored 3 minutes later as his shot deflected on the ground hard and chipped over the keeper.  In the 89th minute, Jermaine Taylor sent the ball into his own net, leveling New England.  The final score was 1–1 giving the Timbers a point on the road and still looking for their first clean sheet of the season.

Position at the end of April

May
The Timbers started off May with a match at home against Toronto FC.  It was the first time the Timbers would play against former midfielder and Portland favorite, Will Johnson.  Adi would score early in the 17th minute with assists from Valeri and Mattocks.  Right before the half, at the 40th minute, Will Johnson was able to shoot a low rocket into the back of the net.  He had a moment of excitement but then proceeded to not celebrate against his former club.  The Timbers would win it as the final goal was struck by Diego Valeri, which also happened to be his birthday that day, from a free kick around 22 yards out.  With the help of backup goalkeeper, Jake Gleeson, who made 4 amazing saves, the Timbers would take 3 points at home with a 2–1 win.

For their first Cascadia match of the year, the Timbers traveled to Canada to face Vancouver Whitecaps FC.  The Timbers were able to strike first with Nat Borchers who had a beautiful setup from Darlington Nagbe and Fanendo Adi.  Vancouver would later answer back with two goals, sealing the win at 2–1 and remaining undefeated in the Cascadia Cup.

The Timbers took on New York City FC for the first time at Providence Park.  Adi was able to score another goal, moving his top scorer record to 8 for the 2016 season.  The Timbers would fall 2–1 in the end, extending their losing streak to 3.

The Timbers finished off their month of May, traveling to Bridgeview, Illinois to face the Chicago Fire.  Valeri sent one to the back of the net in the 18th minute, but two minutes later, Chicago equalized with DP, David Accam.  Both teams would settle for a point and the Timbers continue to look for their first win on the road.

Position at the end of May

June

The Timbers started the month of June back home against San Jose Earthquakes.  Liam Ridgewell was the lone scorer by a header from Diego Valeri's free kick outside the 18 yard box.  In extra time in the first half, the Timbers would lose Dairon Asprilla to a red card from an elbow to the face.  The Timbers were also able to clutch their first clean sheet with Jake Gleeson protecting the net and having only 10 men for the 2nd half.

The Timbers entered the 102nd U.S. Open Cup at home against San Jose Earthquakes, who the team recently defeated at the start of the month in regular MLS season play.  Dairon Asprilla would manage to score first from a shot that rolled out of the hands of goal keeper Bryan Meredith.  Jack McInerney would follow up shortly with a second goal from a free kick a bit past the 18-yard box.  The Timbers would go on to win 2–0, giving Jake Gleeson his second clean sheet of the year.  During the fifth round draw, The Timbers drew LA Galaxy at Providence Park.  The winner of that match would then go to host the quarterfinals of the U.S. Open Cup.

The Timbers went on their only away match for this month to Salt Lake City to face off against Real Salt Lake.  Fanendo Adi would score, raising his count this year to nine goals with an assist from Jermaine Taylor.  Lucas Melano was able to score his first goal of the season.  The Timber's would tie Salt Lake 2–2.

The Timber's played their final June league match at home against Houston Dynamo.  Playing in 87(°F) degree weather, the Timbers fell behind two goals in the 28th and 30th minute.  At the 2nd half, the Timbers would rally back with a goal from Lucas Melano, assisted by Diego Valeri in the 63rd minute.  Diego Valeri was gifted a penalty at the 82nd minute which he successfully converted.  Finally near the final whistle, at the 90+1 minute, Diego Valeri was given another penalty shot and successfully sent the ball to the back of the net, completing the Timber's comeback and collecting all 3 points.

The Timbers would be eliminated from the U.S. Open Cup, following a 0–1 loss to LA Galaxy.

Position at the end of June

July

The Timbers start their month of July on the road against Colorado Rapids, who would be starting veteran USA goalkeeper, Tim Howard for the first time.  The Timbers were without Diego Valeri and Liam Ridgewell, however, both sides were able to keep a clean sheet and ended the match 0-0.

Continuing their 6-match unbeaten streak, the Timbers traveled to New York to face the Red Bulls.  Still without Adam Kawarsey and Diego Valeri, the Timbers held a clean sheet with New York at 0–0, giving both teams a point and raising the Timber's unbeaten streak to 7.

After a very short break, the Timbers returned home to face Montreal Impact.  With both sides still missing key players such as Diego Valeri for the Timbers and Didier Drogba for the Impact,  both sides would fight for a draw with Jack McInerney being the lone scorer for the Timbers.  This put the Timbers to 8 games without a loss.

For the first time this year, the Timbers met with their main rivals, Seattle Sounders FC at home.  Diego Valeri would return from his injury and capture a brace in the 44th and 50th minute with one being assisted by Lucas Melano and the other by Jermaine Taylor. Chad Marshall of Seattle Sounders FC would give them one goal; however, Fanendo Adi would put the Timbers back up by two with a goal in the 64th minute, assisted by Melano.  The Timbers would win 3–1 and putting them currently in first place for the Cascadia Cup by goal differentials.

Attempting to continue to their undefeated streak, the Timbers went against LA Galaxy at home.  LA was without Steven Gerrard and the Timbers without Liam Ridgewell.  The Galaxy were able to take a commanding lead with goals from Robbie Keane in the 7th minute and Gyasi Zardes in the 11th minute.  Zarek Valentin, assisted by Darlington Nagbe, was able to give the Timbers a goal before the end of the half.  Shortly after, Nat Borchers would suffer an Achilles tendon injury that would leave him out for the remainder of the season.  In the end, the Timbers would fall 2–1 and ending their streak at 9.

Portland went on the road for the final time for the month and a start to a back to back match of home and away against Sporting Kansas City.  The Timbers were table to hold the score 0–0 at the half, but a goal from Jacob Peterson off of a free kick from Benny Feilhaber.  The Timbers would take another loss as they prepare for CONCACAF Champions League Group play starting mid week.

Position at the end of July

August
For their 2nd time in MLS history, the Timbers began their play in the CONCACAF Champions League.  Their first match in group B was at home against Club Deportivo Dragón.  The Timbers struck first with a goal from Jack McInerney in the 21st minute from a light touch from Diego Valeri's pass.  Dragón would answer back in the 76th minute with a goal from Kenroy Howell.  Finally, in the 90th minute, Adi was able to take a header that hit the crossbar.  Valeri was able to capture the rebound and take a shot that deflected off multiple players of C.D. Dragón and slowly roll slightly pass the line, sealing the Timber's victory, 2–1.

The Timber's completed their first home/away back to back match, this time at home versus Sporting Kansas City.  Vytautas Andriuškevičius started his first MLS league match and played in his natural left fullback position.  The Timber's lost a man early with Diego Chará getting a straight red, however, 32 minutes later, Sporting Kansas City's Soni Mustivar would also be shown a straight red card, making it an even 10-man match.  During the second half, the Timber's would burst to life with an amazing goal from Diego Valeri in the 65th minute that was taken from a bounce off the pitch.  Near the end of the match, Jack Jewsbury would score a howler in the 87th minute from a burdened Darlington Nagbe who was able to complete the pass having dealt with two defenders attacking him.  Finally, Fanendo Adi would seal the victory with a goal in final minutes of the match.  The Timbers were able to get revenge from last week and again move into playoff positioning at 6th place.

The Timber's traveled to the District of Columbia where they fell 0–2 to D.C. United.

The Timbers traveled north to face their main rivals, Seattle Sounders FC.  Both teams were able to keep it 0-0 at the half but at the 61st minute, Clint Dempsey was awarded a penalty from a clip from Vytautas Andriuskevicius.  The Sounders would convert and make it 1–0.  In the 80th minute, Dempsey was able to capture a brace from an assist from Cristian Roldan who would also score in the 83rd minute, putting Seattle up 3–0.  Fanendo Adi, who did not start due to a report of the player missing the team plane as punishment, was able to score the last goal and prevent a shut out from Seattle in added time.  The Timbers would fall 1–3 to their rivals who they will meet again next week.

For the final time during regular season play, the Timbers went against their main rivals, Seattle Sounders at home.  The Sounders would be without Clint Dempsey after he was diagnosed with an irregular heartbeat earlier in the week.  Looking for revenge from last week's loss, the Timbers were able to provide a dominant first half, scoring 4 goals and keeping Seattle quiet until the second half.  The first goal in the 16th minute was a header by Vytas, assisted by Jack Jewsbury. The ball took a deflection off an attempted save from Stefan Frei, hitting the top crossbar, and crossed the line before rolling back out.  The 2nd goal was in the 29th minute by Fanendo Adi from a saved shot from Diego Valeri and send the ball into the back of the net.  In the 29th minute, Lucas Melano captured a goal after passing the ball to Valeri, then sent to Chara, then back to Melano to complete the assists.  On his 2nd start, Steven Taylor would get a quick header from a set piece from Valeri.  This would be Taylor's first goal with the Timbers.  Seattle would manage to get two goals in the 2nd half. One from  Andreas Ivanschitz, assisted by Nicolas Lodeiro in the 47th minute and one by Jordan Morris in the 51st minute, assisted by Ivanschitz and Lodeiro.  The Timbers would hold on to collect 3 points from a final score of 4–2.

Position at the end of August

September
The Timbers traveled to Frisco, Texas to attempt to get their first road win of the season that they still desperately seek.  The Timbers, without Darlington Nagbe or Alvas Powell due to call-ups for national team play, went against FC Dallas who lost 5 starters due to national competition as well.  The Timbers gave up an early penalty to FC Dallas in the 14th minute, taken and scored by Mario Díaz.  Dallas would score again in added time of the first half, this time a goal to Victor Ulloa, putting Dallas up 2–0.  In the 53rd minute, Dallas would put themselves comfortably in the lead again with a goal from Walker Zimmerman, assisted by Mario Díaz.  The Timbers would be able to prevent a shut out with a goal from Diego Valeri in the 87th minute, assisted by Zarek Valentin; however, it would not be enough and the Timbers still look for a road win with only 3 more away matches left in regular season play.

On September 7, 2016, Chris Klute was loaned out to Minnesota United FC until the remainder of the season.

On September 10, the Timbers hosted Real Salt Lake in a crucial match that would keep them fully in control of their playoff fate.  They would prevail with a lone goal in the 12th minute from Fanendo Adi, who sent the Timbers on a 1–0 victory, shutting out Salt Lake.  The Timbers would now prepare for their 2nd CONCACAF Champions League match.

Playing their first CONCACAF Champions league away match of the year, the Timbers traveled to Costa Rica to take on Deportivo Saprissa.  Diego Valeri would strike first putting the timbers up in the 6th minute.  Unfortunately, Jermaine Taylor would equalize for Saprissa in the 33rd minute.  In the 45th and 73rd minutes, Saprissa was awarded two penalties, both taken and scored by Marvin Angulo. Saprissa got their final goal from Fabrizio Ronchetti in the 60th minute. Finally, Fanendo Adi scored in the 68th minute but still would not be enough and the Timbers would settle for a 4–2 loss.

On September 18, Jack Jewsbury, the first Timbers captain of their MLS era, announced he would retire at the end of the 2016 season.

Ending their busy week, the Timbers hosted Philadelphia Union.  The match went scoreless during the first half, however at the start of the second, Diego Valeri put the ball in the back of the net in the 46th minute, assisted by Darren Mattocks.  Immediately after, Chris Pontius would equalize Philadelphia making it 1–1.  A few minutes later, Fanendo Adi would put the Timbers back in the lead with a goal in the 53rd minute.  In the 85th minute, Philadelphia's Joshua Yaro would be should a 2nd yellow and be sent off, giving the Timbers breathing room to close out the match at 2–1.  For the first time this year, the Timbers would move up to 5th place.

The Timbers traveled to Houston where they went against Houston Dynamo.  Still looking for their first road win of the season, the Timbers would fall 3–1 with a lone goal from Diego Valeri in the 51st minute.  Houston's Mauro Manotas would capture a hat trick.

The Timbers traveled to their final away match in CCL Group Stage play to face Club Deportivo Dragón in El Salvador.  The Timbers would go down by a goal by Kevin Melara in the 54th minute.  Fanendo Adi would score in the 79th minute, giving the Timbers a chance to pull back.  In the 90th minute, Darlington Nagbe was able to take a free kick and send the ball in the back of the net, granting the Timbers first away win of the year by finishing the match 2-1 and keeping the Timbers hopes for CCL advancement alive.

Position at the end of September

October
As the regular season begins to come to a close and still chasing a playoff spot, the Timbers traveled to Commerce City to face Colorado Rapids.  The Timbers attempted to serve Colorado their first loss at home with a goal from Diego Valeri that was called offside.  Later in the 63rd Sebastien Le Toux would put the Rapids ahead and take all 3 points from the Timbers with a final score of 1–0.

On October 14, the Timbers announced that they have signed Portland Timbers 2 defender, Marco Farfan to a Homegrown Player deal.  He will be on the active roster during the start of the 2017 season.

Playing their final regular season home match, the Timbers continued their away/home back-to-back matches with Colorado Rapids.  Before the start of the anthem, Jack Jewsbury was honored and said his goodbyes to the crowd.  After the anthem, the Timbers Army raised a tifo saying "Always keep your goals in focus and beautiful things will develop" with two sticks off of each player as a developed photo.  The match began and in the 35th minute, the Timbers were awarded a penalty and it was successfully converted by Fanendo Adi.  Shortly after in the 39th minute, the Timbers were awarded another penalty and was to be taken by Fanendo Adi, unfortunately, the shot was blocked and missed on the rebound.  The Timbers would win 1-0, putting them in full control of their playoff destiny with a win next week in Vancouver.

On October 18, Ned Grabavoy announced that he would retire at the end of the season.

The Timbers traveled for their final match of the season up in Vancouver, B.C. where they challenged Vancouver Whitecaps F.C. for a chance to reach the playoffs and win the Cascadia Cup.  The Timbers Army opened with an E.T. themed tifo saying "Let's get you home".  The match would prove to be a disaster as the Timbers only scored a single goal off a penalty taken and converted by Diego Valeri in the 72nd minute. The Timbers fell, 1–4, losing both a playoff spot and the Cascadia Cup, marking an end to the 2016 season.

Position at the end of the season

Competitions

Competitions overview
{| class="wikitable" style="text-align: center"
|-
!rowspan=2|Competition
!colspan=8|Record
!Started round
!First match
!Last match
!Final position
|-
!
!
!
!
!
!
!
!
!colspan=4|
|-
| MLS Overall (Supporters' Shield)*

|MLS 1
|March 6, 2016
|October 23, 2016
|11th
|-
| MLS Western Conference*

|MLS 1
|March 6, 2016
|October 23, 2016
|7th
|-
| MLS Cup Playoffs

|DNQ
|
|
|
|-
| U.S. Open Cup

|4th Round
|June 15, 2016
|June 29, 2016
|Round of 16
|-
| CONCACAF Champions League

|Group stage (B)
|August 3, 2016
|October 19, 2016
|Group stage
|-
| Cascadia Cup*

|MLS 10
|May 7, 2016
|October 23, 2016
|2nd
|-
! Total

!colspan=4|

MLS Supporters' Shield, MLS Western Conference, and Cascadia Cup are all part of MLS regular season play.  As a result, only the Supporters' Shield portion is included in the total.

Major League Soccer

Preseason
Desert Friendlies

Simple Invitational (Rose City Invitational)

MLS regular season

The 2016 MLS regular-season schedule was released on January 7, 2016.

Results by round

Results by location

Western Conference standings

Overall standings

MLS Cup Playoffs
The Timbers did not defend their 2015 MLS Cup win. They went into the final match of the season needing their first road win of the 2016 season to clinch a playoff berth. The Timbers lost the match against the Vancouver Whitecaps, 4–1, in what was a "shameful ending to a deeply disappointing season."

U.S. Open Cup

CONCACAF Champions League

Group B

Cascadia Cup

The Cascadia Cup is a trophy that was created in 2004 by supporters of the Portland Timbers, Seattle Sounders FC and Vancouver Whitecaps FC. It is awarded to the club with the best record in MLS regular-season games versus the other participants.

Club

Executive staff

Coaching staff

Stadiums

Kits
Kits are used for a period of two years.  Afterwards, a new kit is released.  The year for each kit is offset so that one of the two changes each year.  The primary kit is due to change at the end of this year.

Primary kit
The first kit was released in 2015 and was used until the end of the 2016 season. It features a large chevron on the chest with its primary colors being dark green, light green, and white.  It features the sponsor Alaska Airlines on the front.  In 2016, the first kit was altered to have Alaska's Airline's logo changed to their new logo, which just uses "Alaska".  The kit also received a golden star, which is formal for any club who wins the MLS Cup the previous year.  Inside the star can be found a "15" to commemorate the 2015 year.

Secondary kit
The new secondary kit will be used from 2016 until the end of the 2017 season.  It features a red fading to black hoop style with each fade's border being the shape of thorns which represents Portland's nickname, the Rose City.  The kit however is not full hoops, the back is a solid red where the player's  name and number are featured.  The kit also has an alternative Alaska Airlines logo, however, with "Airlines" in small font below the logo.

Third, alternative kit
The Timbers did not have a third kit for the 2016 season.

Squad information

First-team squad
All players contracted to the club during the season included.
Last updated: August 8, 2016

 (HG) = Homegrown Player
 (GA) = Generation Adidas
 (DP) = Designated Player
 (INT) = International Roster Spot
 (Loan) = On Loan
 (Loaned) = Loaned out to another club

Player/Staff Transactions

Transfers in

Loans in

Loans out

Transfers out

Contract extensions

2015 MLS Re-Entry Draft picks

The first stage of the 2015 MLS Re-Entry Draft took place on December 11, 2015.
The second stage of the 2015 MLS Re-Entry Draft took place on December 17, 2015.

2016 MLS SuperDraft Picks

Rounds 1 and 2 of the draft were held on January 14, 2016. 
Rounds 3 and 4 of the draft were held on January 19, 2016.

Staff in

Staff out

National Team Participation 
Six Timbers players have been called up to play for their national teams during this season.

Honors and awards

MLS Player of the Month

MLS Player of the Week

MLS Goal of the Week

MLS Save of the Week

2016 Club Awards

Statistics

Appearances

Goalkeeper stats
The list is sorted by total minutes played then by jersey number.

Line-up

Top scorers
The list is sorted by shirt number when total goals are equal.

Top assists
The list is sorted by shirt number when total assists are equal.

Clean sheets
The list is sorted by shirt number when total clean sheets are equal.

Summary

References

Portland Timbers
Portland Timbers
Portland Timbers
2016
Port